Rama Varma Kunji pillai Thampuran (1751–1805), or Rama Varma IX, popularly known as Sakthan Thampuran (Sakthan meaning powerful), was the ruler of the Kingdom of Cochin. The current southern Indian city of Kochi was part of the erstwhile princely state of Kochi. He resided at Vadakkechira Palace in Thrissur. The city of Thrissur is referred to as the Cultural Capital of Kerala owing to its many traditional festivals and historic temples. Sakthan Thampuran is considered the architect of the city of Thrissur. The festival Thrissur Pooram was started by him.

Biography

Early life
Born on 26 August 1751 AD at Vellarapally Palace to Anujan Namboodiripad of the Chennamangalam Mana and Ambika Thampuratti of the Cochin Royal Family. His mother died when he was only three years old. The prince was brought up by his maternal aunt, famously known as Chittamma (meaning mother's younger sister) Thampuran. His early education took place under the tutelage of scholars such as Kallenkara Pisharody. Sakthan Thampuran was considered as the most powerful of the Kochi Maharajas as his name indicates.

Marriage

Thampuran married twice. His first wife was a Nair lady from the reputed “Thekke Kuruppath” family of Thrissur whom he married when he was 30 years old. He is said to have had a daughter with this first wife. However, this Nethyar Amma (title of the consort of the Cochin Rajah) died soon after birth. Thereafter the Thampuran remained unmarried for a few decades, marrying again at the age of 52. The second wife of Thampuran was Chummukutty Nethyar Amma of the Karimpatta family and was a musician and dancer. She was 17 at the time of her marriage with the Thampuran. Thampuran died after 4 years of the marriage. At the time, widowed Nethyar Ammas did not receive monetary support from the state, so Chummukutty, at the age of 21, returned to her ancestral home.

Death

After his 55th birthday, Sakthan Thampuran fell ill and died on 26 September 1805,  at Thrissur City. He was cremated at Vadakkechira Palace, now renamed Shakthan Thampuran Palace, Thrissur. There is a monument to him within the palace grounds. His palace in Thrissur City is preserved as a state monument. He is considered to be responsible for the development of Thrissur City and also making it the Cultural Capital of Kerala.

Administration
In 1762, ten tehsils (Kovilakathum vathukkals) and two Edavagas (semi tehsils) were formed in the Kochi Kingdom. But the previous feudal chieftains maintained their stronghold. After Thampuran ascended the throne of Kingdom of Cochin , he took over the land from the feudal chieftains and consolidated the royal power. At that time, the Vadakkunnathan Temple and Peruvanam Mahadeva Temple were controlled by the Namboodiri community, called Yogiatiripppads. The Yogiatiripppads was elected from different temples in the Thrissur District.  Thampuran wrested the control of the temples and abolished the system of Yogiatiripppads. Thampuran's strict approach with criminals earned his name, Sakthan. During the British Raj, British authorities had good relations with Thampuran. He was also a personal friend of Dharma Raja of Travancore.

Legacy

City of Thrissur
 
The modern day town of Thrissur owes its origin to Sakthan Thampuran. The reason for his love of the town was because his two wives were both born here. They belonged to the Kuruppath and Karimpatta families of Thrissur. Sakthan Thampuran transferred his capital from Thrippunithura to Thrissur to found the city. He cleared the  teak forests around the Vadakkunnathan Temple and developed the Thekkinkadu Maidan, which is now at the heart of the city. After clearing the forest, he built a circular concrete road now known as Swaraj Round.

Thrissur Pooram
The Thrissur Pooram or "Mother of all Poorams", as it was known, was the brainchild of Sakthan Thampuran. At the time, Arattupuzha Pooram was the largest temple festival in Kerala. Temples in and around the city of Thrissur were regular participants. Once, they were denied entry to Arattupuzha Pooram because they were late. All the late participant temples went to Sakthan Thampuran, then Maharaja of Cochin, and complained about the issue. Thampuran invited all the temples to bring their deities to Thrissur and pay obeisance to Lord Shiva, the deity of the Vadakkunnathan Temple. Thampuran classified the participants into two groups, the Western and the Eastern. The Western group consisted of the Thiruvambady, Kanimangalam, Laloor, Ayyanthole, and Nethilakkavu temples while the Paramekkavu, Karamukku, Chembukavu, Choorakottukavu and Panamukkamppilly temples came under the eastern group.

Shakthan Thampuran Palace

It is one of the most historic cultural and architecturally relevant palace of the erstwhile Maharaja of Cochin, which has now been converted into a heritage museum. The palace is now a blend of traditional Kerala and Dutch architectural styles following its 1795 reconstruction.

See also
Timeline of Thrissur
Thrissur Pooram
Thrissur
Kerala
Perumpadapu Swaroopam
Kingdom of Cochin

References
Sources
 Aithihyamala by Kottarathil Sankunni
 Cochin State Manual

Notes

External links 
 
 

1751 births
1805 deaths
Rulers of Cochin
Thrissur Pooram
18th-century Indian monarchs
19th-century Indian monarchs